The 1942 Saint Louis Billikens football team was an American football team that represented Saint Louis University as a member of the Missouri Valley Conference (MVC) during the 1942 college football season. In its third season under head coach Dukes Duford, the team compiled a 4–5 record and was outscored by a total of 215 to 110. The team played its home games at Edward J. Walsh Memorial Stadium in St. Louis.

Schedule

References

Saint Louis
Saint Louis Billikens football seasons
Saint Louis Billikens football